Kaebi is an Arabic surname that may refer to 
Ahmed Al-Kaebi (born 1987), Saudi football player
Hossein Kaebi (born 1985), Iranian football player
Ibrahim Al-Kaebi (born 1993), Emirati football player
Tareq Al-Kaebi (born 1992), Saudi football player 

Arabic-language surnames